William Herbert Vernon Blackwood (13 February 1873 – 31 March 1957) was an  Australian rules footballer who played with South Melbourne and St Kilda in the Victorian Football League (VFL).

References

External links 

1873 births
1957 deaths
Australian rules footballers from Victoria (Australia)
Sydney Swans players
St Kilda Football Club players
People from Daylesford, Victoria